The 1990 Lion Cup was the eighth edition of the Lion Cup, the premier domestic rugby union knock-out competition in South Africa.

Teams
All 25 South African provincial teams took part in this competition. They were ranked as follows:

Competition

This competition was a knock-out competition. The 25 teams were divided into six groups of four teams (with a fifth team in Group F). The teams ranked 24 and 25 played each other in the Qualifying Round with the winner advancing to Round One. In Round One, the teams from Group C played against the teams in Group E, while the teams in Group D played against the teams in Group F. In Round Two, the winners of the eight Round One ties played against each other for a place in Round Three. The winners of the four Round Two matches then joined teams in Group B for Round Three, with the winning teams progressing to the quarter finals (where they were joined by the teams from Group A), followed by Semi-Finals and the Final.

Fixtures and results

The fixtures were as follows:

Qualifying round

Round one

Round two

Round three

Quarter-finals

Semi-finals

Final

See also
 1990 Currie Cup Division A
 1990 Currie Cup Division B
 1990 Santam Bank Trophy

References

1990
1990 in South African rugby union
1990 rugby union tournaments for clubs